North East Derbyshire is a constituency created in 1885 represented in the House of Commons of the UK Parliament since 2017 by Lee Rowley of the Conservative Party. This was the first time a Conservative candidate had been elected since 1935.

The seat had been, relative to others, a marginal seat from 2005 to 2019 as its winner's majority had not exceeded 5.7% of the vote since the 23.2% majority won in that year. The seat has changed hands once since that year and is no longer marginal after the 26% majority won in 2019.

History
Summary of results
The seat was created in the Redistribution of Seats Act 1885. Until 1910, the area was regularly represented by a Liberal MP.  From the 1935 to the 2015 elections inclusive N.E. Derbyshire returned Labour candidates in succession. In 2010 and 2015 the results featured marginal majorities (a majority of relatively few percentage points between the winner's and the runner-up's tallies). The runner-up candidate from 1945 to 2015 inclusive was Conservative. The 2015 result for example gave the seat the 17th-smallest majority of Labour's 232 seats by percentage of majority. The seat was at the following election one of six gains between the two parties counterbalancing Conservative losses (the party emerged as the biggest single party by more than fifty seats and with an increased share of the vote but with a net loss of thirteen seats). Rowley's local majority was 5.7% of votes cast.

Other parties
In line with nationwide swing in 2015, UKIP fielded a candidate who won more than 5% of the vote therefore kept their deposit; the Liberal Democrat candidate forfeited their deposit in 2015. The Green Party fielded a candidate for the first time in 2015; the party's Kesteven forfeited his deposit. These three parties forfeited their deposits in 2017.

Turnout
Turnout has ranged from 58.9% in 2001 to 86.4% in 1950.

Constituency profile
In the 20th century, mining and associated industries were an important source of employment and primary industries for the wider economy, though the former ceased around 1970. At about the same time, some ex-mining towns like Dronfield saw much middle class commuter house building in areas like Dronfield Woodhouse; jobs were typically in Sheffield and Chesterfield.

The western edge of the constituency borders the Peak District and is home to many rural villages.

Boundaries

1885–1918: The Sessional Division of Eckington, and in the Sessional Division of Chesterfield the parishes of Bolsover, Staveley, and Whittington.

1918–1950: The Urban Districts of Urban Districts of Bolsover and Dronfield, the Rural Districts of Clowne and Norton, and part of the Rural District of Chesterfield.

1950–1983: The Urban Districts of Clay Cross and Dronfield, and part of the Rural District of Chesterfield.

1983–2010: The District of North East Derbyshire wards of Ashover, Barlow and Holmesfield, Brampton and Walton, Clay Cross North, Clay Cross South, Coal Aston, Dronfield North, Dronfield South, Dronfield Woodhouse, Eckington North, Eckington South, Gosforth Valley, Hasland, Holmewood and Heath, Killamarsh East, Killamarsh West, North Wingfield Central, Renishaw, Ridgeway and Marsh Lane, Tupton, Unstone, and Wingerworth, and the Borough of Chesterfield wards of Barrow Hill and Hollingwood, and Lowgates and Woodthorpe.

2010–present: The District of North East Derbyshire wards of Ashover, Barlow and Holmesfield, Brampton and Walton, Clay Cross North, Clay Cross South, Coal Aston, Dronfield North, Dronfield South, Dronfield Woodhouse, Eckington North, Eckington South, Gosforth Valley, Grassmoor, Killamarsh East, Killamarsh West, North Wingfield Central, Renishaw, Ridgeway and Marsh Lane, Tupton, Unstone, and Wingerworth, and the Borough of Chesterfield wards of Barrow Hill and New Whittington, and Lowgates and Woodthorpe.

The North East Derbyshire constituency covers the north eastern part of Derbyshire, surrounding Chesterfield on three sides.  It covers most of the area of North East Derbyshire District Council.

Members of Parliament

Elections

Elections in the 2010s

Elections in the 2000s

Elections in the 1990s

Elections in the 1980s

Elections in the 1970s

Elections in the 1960s

Elections in the 1950s

Elections in the 1940s

Elections in the 1930s

Elections in the 1920s

Elections in the 1910s

General Election 1914–15:

Another General Election was required to take place before the end of 1915. The political parties had been making preparations for an election to take place and by the July 1914, the following candidates had been selected; 
Unionist: George Bowden
Liberal: John Houfton

Elections in the 1900s

Elections in the 1890s

Elections in the 1880s

See also
 List of parliamentary constituencies in Derbyshire

Notes

References

Parliamentary constituencies in Derbyshire
Constituencies of the Parliament of the United Kingdom established in 1885